Acronicta bellula is a moth of the family Noctuidae. It is found in the Korean Peninsula, northern China, north-eastern Mongolia, the Russian Far East (Primorye, southern Khabarovsk, southern Amur region) and southern Transbaikalia.

References

External links
Korean Insects

Acronicta
Moths of Asia
Moths described in 1895